HMS Algiers was a 91-gun second rate ship of the line of the Royal Navy.

She was initially ordered from Pembroke Dockyard on 3 October 1833 as a 110-gun first rate to a design by Sir William Symonds. On 10 December 1834, the order for Algiers was changed to a 74-gun two decker, but this was changed once more to a 110-gun ship on 5 February 1839. The order was amended once more, to complete her as a 90-gun Albion-class ship of the line on 26 December 1840, and she was laid down at Plymouth Dockyard on 10 July 1843. Her designs were amended once more, and she was re-ordered on 25 April 1847 to a lengthened design. The Admiralty ordered that she be fitted with screw propulsion while under construction in 1852.

In May 1855, she took part in the capture of Kerch and Yenikale during the Crimean War. Afterwards, she saw service in Malta and was later a depot ship for the gunboat flotilla at Portsmouth. She was present at the 1856 Fleet Review at Spithead.

References 

1854 ships
Ships of the line of the Royal Navy
Ships built in Plymouth, Devon